Buffalo Pound Provincial Park is a provincial park located in southern Saskatchewan, Canada, about  north-east of downtown Moose Jaw and  north-west of the city of Regina.

The park centres on Buffalo Pound Lake, a prairie lake formed from glaciation about 10,000 years ago. Seasonal recreation activities include swimming (two public beaches and a pool), camping, fishing, mini-golf, biking, hiking, and access to the Trans Canada Trail. The park also features a captive herd of buffalo, along with the Nicolle Flats Marsh where a variety of wildlife can be observed. There is also a trout pond, known as Buffalo Pond, which is stocked with rainbow, brown, and tiger trout. Highways 202 and 301 intersect near the park.

Amenities and attractions
There are seven different camping areas in the park with a total of about 270 campsites. Many of the individual sites have electric, water, and sewer services. The seven campgrounds are Lake Side, Elm View, Valley, Maple Vale, Shady Lane, Trail Ends, Lower Chalet, and Rankins Campgrounds.

Two disc golf courses are in the park. One is a 9-hole course for beginners and the other is a professional 18-hole course.

Completed in 2020, the park features a 4,000 square foot heated swimming pool called Buffalo Pound Provincial Park Pool. This pool replaced the original one, which was built in 1972.

Opportunities are available for canoeing, kayaking, swimming, fishing, and boating at the beach areas along the lake. Also at the beach, Sask Aquatic Adventures has a water adventure park set up. It is one of nine in Saskatchewan. The others are located at Blackstrap Lake, the Battlefords, Regina Beach, Duck Mountain, Greenwater Lake, Tufts Bay on Lake Diefenbaker by Elbow, Sandy Bay at Candle Lake Provincial Park, and Greig Lake at Meadow Lake Provincial Park.

There are over 30 kilometres of mountain biking trails of varying difficulty levels, multiple hiking and walking trails totalling over 16 kilometres, bison viewing areas, mini-golf, and picnicking sites.

Nicolle Flats Marsh
Nicolle Flats Marsh, with a total area of 73.18 square kilometres and an elevation of 511 metres, is a large marshy area located in the park at the south-east corner of Buffalo Pound Lake. The confluence of the Qu'Appelle and Moose Jaw Rivers is in the marsh. The area is an Important Bird Area of Canada (SK 060 Nicolle Flats) and is home to several species including Mallards, American white pelicans, black-crowned night-herons, Franklins gulls, willow flycatchers, yellow-breasted chats, great blue herons, and black terns.

Several interpretive trails wind their way in and around the marsh and park area, including Nicolle Flats Trail (9.8), Valley Interpretive Trail (1.5), Dyke Trail (4.5 km), Bison View Interpretive Trail (3 km), 
and Marsh Boardwalk Trail (0.5). The Dyke Trail is part of the Trans Canada Trail.

Nicolle Homestead
The Nicolle Homestead (50°33'26"N, 105°17'52.4"W) was built by Charles Nicolle and his family in 1903. It is located at the easternmost part of the park. Charles Nicolle was a veteran of the North-West Mounted Police and settled in the Qu'Appelle Valley with his family and 1881. All that remains of the homestead is the fieldstone house that was built in 1903. The farm was named Mapleford and the Nicolle family lived and farmed there until 1959. The site can be reached along the Nicolle Flats Trail.

See also
List of protected areas of Saskatchewan
Tourism in Saskatchewan

References

External links 
 Buffalo Pound Provincial Park

Provincial parks of Saskatchewan
Division No. 6, Saskatchewan
Important Bird Areas of Saskatchewan